More Than Ever is the third studio album by American hip hop artist Sims, a member of Minneapolis hip hop collective Doomtree. It was released on Doomtree Records on November 4, 2016.

Music 
The album is produced by Icetep of Minneapolis hip hop group Killstreak and Doomtree producers Paper Tiger and Lazerbeak.

Track listing

Personnel 
Adapted from the album's Bandcamp page.

 Joe Mabbott – mixing
 Bruce Templeton – mastering
 Lazerbeak – executive producer
 Andy Lund – artwork

Charts

References

External links 
 
 More Than Ever at Bandcamp

2016 albums
Sims (rapper) albums
Doomtree Records albums
Albums produced by Lazerbeak